Dighi Port is a sea port in Maharashtra, India, on the eastern coast of the Arabian Sea,  from the Mumbai port. The port is operated by Adani Ports & SEZ.

History
Adani Ports and Special Economic Zone Limited (Adani Ports & SEZ) completed the acquisition of Dighi Port Limited on 15 February 2021 for Rs 705 crore.

References

External links
Official site

Ports and harbours of Maharashtra
Economy of Maharashtra